Jeffrey William Hughes (born 1966) is a United States Navy vice admiral who serves as the Deputy Chief of Naval Operations for Warfighting Development of the United States Navy since February 1, 2021.

Early life
Hughes was raised in Pittsburgh, Pennsylvania. In 1988, he graduated with a Bachelor of Science in mechanical engineering from Duke University and then graduated with distinction with a Master of Arts in national security and strategic studies from the Naval War College in Newport, Rhode Island, with full Joint Professional Military Education credit.

Naval career
In September 1989, Hughes was designated a naval aviator, flying MH-60R and SH-60B Seahawk helicopters.

In 1993, Hughes was named HSL-44 (now HSM-74) Pilot of the Year and was the co-recipient of the Commanding Officer's Helmsman Award. Hughes served as the flag lieutenant to commander for  Carrier Group 4 on all six East Coast aircraft carriers. He then served as the executive officer and the 14th commanding officer of the Fighting Vipers of HSL-48 (now HSM-48). In 2007, he received the Helicopter Maritime Strike Wing, United States Atlantic Fleet Navy and Marine Association peer-selected leadership award. He also served as the commander, Helicopter Maritime Strike Wing, United States Pacific Fleet. In his first flag assignment, he served as the commander, Navy Recruiting Command. On July 21, 2017, he was appointed as commander of Expeditionary Strike Group 2.

On September 24, 2017, Hughes' command, Expeditionary Strike Group Kearsarge which included the amphibious assault ship  and the dock landing ship  along with the 2,400 marines of 26th Marine Expeditionary Unit, deployed off the coast of Puerto Rico to coordinate naval relief efforts after Hurricane Maria. The ships had previously been prepositioned to the south of the island to assist in the recovery efforts once the hurricane had passed.

In March 2018, Hughes assumed command of Navy Personnel Command and became Deputy Chief of Naval Personnel. On November 12, 2020, he was nominated for promotion to vice admiral and assignment as Deputy Chief of Naval Operations for Warfighting Development. On December 14, 2020, his nomination was confirmed by voice vote of the full United States Senate.

Hughes' decorations include the Navy Distinguished Service Medal, Defense Superior Service Medal, the Legion of Merit (four awards), and the Meritorious Service Medal (two awards).

References

1966 births
Living people
Place of birth missing (living people)
Duke University Pratt School of Engineering alumni
United States Naval Aviators
Naval War College alumni
Recipients of the Meritorious Service Medal (United States)
Recipients of the Legion of Merit
United States Navy admirals
Recipients of the Defense Superior Service Medal